Flicker is the debut studio album by Irish singer Niall Horan. It was released on 20 October 2017 by Neon Haze Music and Capitol Records. "This Town" was released on 29 September 2016 as the album's lead single, followed by "Slow Hands", "Too Much to Ask", "On the Loose", and "Seeing Blind".

Flicker debuted on the Billboard 200 chart at number one sellling 152,000 units in the U.S., Horan's first number one album in the U.S. as a solo artist.

Background
In June 2016, Horan confirmed that he was working on his first studio album, saying, "I've been in the studio writing bits and pieces. It's just for fun at the moment. I've made relationships with different writers up and down the years so I'm putting them into action now." In September 2016, it was announced that Horan had signed a solo deal with Capitol Records. Talking to the Daily Star Horan said, "I have been working on [the album] since March 2016. It has been a year and a half in the making and it is finally time for people to hear it." In an interview with Entertainment Weekly, Horan said the album was inspired by classic rock acts including Fleetwood Mac and the Eagles. "Whenever I would pick up a guitar, I would always naturally play chords like that, and finger pick a lot and play that folky kind of style." He also described the collection as having a "folk-with-pop feel to it". 

In August 2017, Horan debuted several songs from the album during a live show at the Shepherd's Bush Empire in London. He revealed that he had contacted Maren Morris asking her to contribute to his song "Seeing Blind". On 15 September 2017, Horan announced the album on his social media accounts, revealing the album's title, cover art, and release date as well as the release of the third single from the album, "Too Much to Ask". The track list was unveiled on 22 September 2017. Horan told Zane Lowe on his Beats 1 radio show that the album's title track, "Flicker", meant the most to him and "was a very poignant moment in the recording process", to the extent that "it changed the way I recorded the rest of the album". He also expressed in his op-ed for The Independent that the album O by Damien Rice had inspired the production of the aforementioned track and "Paper Houses".

Promotion

Singles
The album's lead single, "This Town" was released with an accompanying music video of a live performance on 29 September 2016. It was Horan's first single outside of the boy band One Direction. It peaked at number nine on the UK Singles Chart, and number 20 on the US Billboard Hot 100. The second single, "Slow Hands", was released on 4 May 2017. After it was released it received favourable reviews from critics, with Billboard describing the song as a "R&B-inflected rock tune". The single charted within the top 10 in a number of countries and reached number 11 on the US Billboard Hot 100. 

"Too Much to Ask" was released as the third single on 15 September 2017. The music video was uploaded to YouTube on 21 September 2017. "On the Loose" was announced as the album's fourth single on 5 February 2018. It was playing on US Mainstream Top 40 radio on 20 February 2018. "Seeing Blind" was the fifth single in June 2018. An official acoustic video clip was released on 4 June 2018.

Tour

Horan embarked on his first headlining concert tour, Flicker Sessions to promote the album. The concert series was announced on 10 July 2017 on Horan's social media accounts and website. It began on 29 August 2017 at the Olympia Theatre in Dublin, Ireland. Later Horan embarked on his second tour in support of the album, the Flicker World Tour.

Critical reception

At Metacritic, which assigns a normalised rating out of 100 to reviews from mainstream critics, the album has an average score of 64 out of 100, which indicates "generally favorable reviews" based on 5 reviews.

Nick Levine of NME was positive about the album, calling its content "appealingly simple and straightforward", noting Horan's influences of Fleetwood Mac and the Eagles, concluding his review by praising it as a "promising" and "well-pitched" debut. Neil Yeung of AllMusic was similarly positive, noting Horan's "big first step" into musical maturity, finding his "own voice". Andy Gill, for The Independent, wrote that "it would have been easy for the One Direction heartthrob to trot out a collection of ersatz R&B crowd-pleasers", but instead "he keeps faith with the West Coast influences that first drew him into music", while also noting Fleetwood Mac's influence and complimenting "the formula of fat, warm bass and drums anchoring light guitars". Neil McCormick of The Daily Telegraph commented that "the songs are immediately distinctive" and called the album as a whole "tasteful", adding that "chord changes are sweetly satisfying, melodies spill gently forth with singing that is soft, tuneful and emotionally understated" while comparing the album's sounds to those of Fleetwood Mac and The Eagles. Writers for Rolling Stone named Flicker one of the top albums of the year, writing that Horan "turns on the soft-rock charm on his solo debut" and that the album allows "Horan to winkingly flaunt his fully grown status" while calling "Slow Hands" "not so secretly one of the best solo singles from a former 1D member to hit radio this year". Ed Power of The Irish Examiner praised the album's authenticity and the "level of tepid craftsmanship, from which it rarely departs" while calling Horan "unquestionably an accomplished musician and vocalist".

Some reviews were more mixed, with Alexis Petridis of The Guardian calling it "middle of the road" and stating that "none of it is terribly exciting". While adding that it may be "easy to mock", he later contrasted its content and potential positively against that of Horan's past bandmates, Harry Styles and Zayn Malik. Louise Bruton of The Irish Times gave the album a two-star review (out of five), commenting that "it reeks of nostalgia for Don Henley’s Hotel California". Craig Jenkins of Vulture wrote that "the album loads all of its best material up front" while describing the latter part of the album as full of "delicate, drippy acoustic tunes" that "are perfectly pleasant" but "don’t ask much of the singer". Jenkins ended his review by saying the album "is a good start" although it "often smolders but it never really catches fire".

Commercial performance
In Ireland and the Netherlands, Flicker debuted at number one. With 152,000 album-equivalent units and 128,000 copies sold in the United States, it also opened atop the Billboard 200, tying One Direction with the Beatles for the most members (three) with a solo US number-one album. Horan also became the group's third member to top the Canadian Albums Chart when the record entered at the summit with over 16,000 consumption units in the nation. Elsewhere the album debuted at number two in Australia and Italy while opening at number three in New Zealand, Scotland, and the United Kingdom.

Track listing

Notes
 signifies an additional producer

Personnel
Credits adapted from the liner notes of Flicker.

Personnel and musicians

Niall Horan – lead vocals, guitar 
Maren Morris – featured artist 
AFTERHRS – synthesizer 
Vern Asbury – guitars 
Tom Barnes – drums , percussion 
Alisha Bauer – cello 
Eli Beaird – bass guitar 
Daniel Bryer – background vocals 
Julian Bunetta – background vocals , percussion , drums , piano , bass guitar , guitar , keyboards 
Ann Marie Calhoun – violin 
Matt Chamberlain – drums 
Daphne Chen – string quartet , violin 
Irina Chirkova – cello 
Ruth-Anne Cunningham – background vocals 
Eric Darken – percussion 
Dave Emery – keyboards 
Ian Fitchuk – drums , piano 
Ian Franzino – bass guitar , drums , guitar , keyboards 
Ilona Geller – viola 
Mark Goldenberg – guitar 
Eric Gorfain – violin 
Andrew Haas – bass guitar , drums , guitar , keyboards 
Jedd Hughes – electric guitar 
John Joseph – bass guitar 
Leah Katz – string quarter , viola 
Peter Kelleher – organ 
Tommy King – keyboards , organ 
Sam Klempner – background vocals , bass guitar 
Ben Kohn – claps , bells 
Greg Kurstin – acoustic guitar , bass guitar , drums , guitar , piano , keyboards , electric guitar , synthesizers 
Greg Leisz – acoustic guitar 
Todd Lombardo – acoustic guitar 
Val McCallum – guitar 
Mike Needle – background vocals 
Zac Rae – piano , synthesizers 
John Ryan – background vocals , guitar , bass 
Bridget Sarai – background vocals 
Jamie Scott – background vocals 
Aaron Sterling – drums , percussion 
Chris Stills – background vocals 
Spencer Thomson – acoustic guitar , electric guitar , guitar 
Leah Zeger – violin

Production

AFTERHRS – production , recording , additional production , programming 
Chris Bishop – additional vocal engineering 
Daniel Bryer – additional programming 
Julian Bunetta – production , recording , programming , additional recording 
Julian Burg – recording 
Nathan Dantzler – mastering
Eric Darken – drum programming 
Brendan Dekora – recording assistant 
Dave Emery – programming 
Ian Franzino – programming 
Michael Freeman – mixing assistant
Eric Gorfain – string arrangement 
Eric Greedy – additional recording 
Andrew Haas – programming 
Martin Hannah – recording 
Jacquire King – production , recording , programming , session conductor 
Sam Klempner – additional engineering 
Greg Kurstin – production , recording , string arrangement , drum programming 
Kolton Lee – vocal editing 
Alex Pasco – recording 
John Rausch – recording 
Jamie Scott – recording , additional programming 
Mark "Spike" Stent – additional production , mixing, programming 
Spencer Thomson – programming 
TMS – production , recording

Design
Conor McDonnell – interior gatefold photo
David Needleman – photography
Nick Steinhardt – design

Charts

Weekly charts

Year-end charts

Certifications

References

2017 debut albums
Niall Horan albums
Capitol Records albums
Albums produced by Greg Kurstin
Albums produced by Jacquire King
Albums recorded at EastWest Studios
Soft rock albums by Irish artists
Folk albums by Irish artists
Country albums by Irish artists
Albums produced by TMS (production team)